Khin The (January 1814 – 3 May 1872), commonly known by her regnal title Thiri Maha Yadana Mingala Dewi, was the Queen of the Northern Palace of King Mindon Min during the Konbaung dynasty.

Biography
At her age 13, she serving as a lady-in-waiting to Nanmadaw Me Nu when her father, Tha Phyu, serving as mayor of Sagaing. In 1834, she became a royal concubine of Prince Mindon. When Prince Mindon and Kanaung Mintha fled to Shwebo, Khin The accompanied them. Before the end of the rebellion, Prince Mindon pledged to make Khin The as the chief queen if he ascended the throne. When Mindon ascended the throne, it was difficult for Khin The to be made the chief queen because she was not a royal blood. However, she became the Queen of the Northern Palace with the royal title Thiri Maha Yadana Mingala Dewi on 26 March 1853. 

She did not bear any issue but she adopted Salin Supaya, daughter of her half-sister Limban Mibaya, and Kwutywa Princess, daughter of Tamabin Mibaya. She died on 3 May 1872 and was buried in the Mandalay Palace stockade.

Notes

References

See also 
 Konbaung dynasty
 List of Burmese consorts

Konbaung dynasty
Burmese Buddhists
Queens consort of Konbaung dynasty
1810s births
1872 deaths